Taxonus is a genus of common sawflies in the family Tenthredinidae. There are about 8 described species in Taxonus.

Species
 Taxonus borealis MacGillivray, 1895
 Taxonus epicera (Say, 1836)
 Taxonus pallicoxus (Provancher, 1885)
 Taxonus pallidicornis (Norton, 1868)
 Taxonus pallipes
 Taxonus rufocinctus Norton, 1860
 Taxonus spiculatus MacGillivray, 1908
 Taxonus terminalis (Say, 1824)

References

Further reading

 

Tenthredinidae